Baguazhang or Pakua chang is one of the three main Chinese martial arts of the Wudang school, the other two being T'ai chi and Xing Yi Quan. It is more broadly grouped as an internal practice (or neijia quan). Bāguà zhǎng literally means "eight trigram palm", referring to the bagua "trigrams" of the I Ching (Yijing), one of the canons of Taoism.

History
The creation of Baguazhang as a formalized martial art, is attributed to Dong Haichuan, who is said to have learned from Taoist and Buddhist masters in the mountains of rural China during the early 19th century. Many Chinese authorities do not accept the Buddhist origin, instead maintaining that those teachers were purely Taoist in origin, the evidence lying in Baguazhang's frequent reference to core concepts central to Taoism, such as Yin and Yang theory, I Ching and Taoism's most distinctive paradigm, the Bagua diagram. The attribution to Buddhist teachers came from the 2nd generation teachers, i.e. Dong Haichuan's students, some of whom were Buddhist. There is evidence to suggest a synthesis of several pre-existing martial arts taught and practised in the region in which Dong Haichuan lived, combined with Taoist circle walking. Through his work as a servant in the Imperial Palace he impressed the emperor with his graceful movements and fighting skill, and became an instructor and a bodyguard to the court. Dong Haichuan taught for many years in Beijing, eventually earning patronage by the Imperial court.

Famous disciples of Dong Haichuan to become teachers were Yin Fu, Cheng Tinghua, Ma Gui, Song Changrong, Liu Fengchun, Ma Weiqi, Liu Baozhen, Liang Zhenpu and Liu Dekuan. Although they were all students of the same teacher, their methods of training and expressions of palm techniques differed. The Cheng and Liu styles are said to specialize in "pushing" the palms, Yin style is known for "threading" the palms, Song's followers practice "Plum Flower" ( Mei Hua) palm technique and Ma style palms are known as "hammers." Some of Dong Haichuan's students, including Cheng Tinghua, participated in the Boxer Rebellion. In general, most bagua exponents today practice either the Yin, Cheng, or Liang styles, although Fan, Shi, Liu, Fu, and other styles also exist.  (The Liu style is a special case, in that it is rarely practiced alone, but as a complement to other styles). In addition, there are sub-styles of the above methods as well, such as the Sun, Gao, and Jiang styles, which are sub-styles of Cheng method.

Modern styles
Yin Style: Yin Fu
Cheng Style: Cheng Tinghua
Liang Style: Liang Zhenpu
Gao Style: Gao Yisheng
Yin Sect Gao Style: Gao Ziying
Jiang Style: Jiang Rong Qiao
Shi Style: Shi Jidong
Song Style: Song Changrong  and Song Yongxiang
Fan Family Style: Fan Zhiyong
Liu Style: Liu Baozhen
Ma Style: Ma Weiqi
Ma Gui Style: Ma Gui
Gong Baotian Style: Gong Baotian
Sun Style: Sun Lutang
Fu Style: Fu Zhensong
Yin Yang Style (Tian Style): Tian Hui
Ho Ho Choy Baguazhang: He Kecai
Lu Style: Lu Shui-Tian (盧水田)

Common aspects
The practice of circle walking, or "turning the circle", as it is sometimes called, is Baguazhang's characteristic method of stance and movement training. All forms of Baguazhang utilize circle walking as an integral part of training. Practitioners walk around the edge of the circle in various low stances, facing the center, and periodically change direction as they execute forms. For a beginner, the circle is six to twelve feet in diameter. Students first learn flexibility and proper body alignment through the basic exercises, then move on to more complex forms and internal power mechanics.  Although the internal aspects of Baguazhang are similar to those of Xingyiquan and Taijiquan, they are distinct in nature.

Many distinctive styles of weapons are contained within Baguazhang; some use concealment, like the "judge's pen" or a pair of knives (the most elaborate, which are unique to the style, are the crescent-shaped deer horn knives. Baguazhang is also known for practicing with extremely large weapons, such as the bāguà jian, or bagua sword, and the bāguà dāo, or bagua broadsword. Other, more conventional weapons are also used, such as the staff (gun), spear (qiang), cane (guai), hook sword (gou) and the straight, double-edged sword (jian). Baguazhang practitioners are also known for being able to use anything as a weapon using the principles of their art.

Baguazhang contains an extremely wide variety of techniques as well as weapons, including various strikes (with palm, fist, elbow, fingers, etc.), kicks, joint locks, throws, and distinctively evasive circular footwork. As such, Baguazhang is considered neither a purely striking nor a purely grappling martial art. Baguazhang emphasizes circular movement, allowing practitioners to flow out of the way of objects and opponents. This is the source of the theory of being able to fight multiple attackers. Baguazhang's evasive nature is also shown by the practice of moving behind an attacker, so that the opponent cannot harm the practitioner.

Although the many branches of Baguazhang are often quite different from each other (some, like Cheng style, specialize in close-in wrestling and joint locks, while others, like some of the Yin styles, specialize in quick, long-range striking), all have circle walking, spiraling movement, and certain methods and techniques (piercing palms, crashing palms, etc.) in common.

Baguazhang's movements employ the whole body with smooth coiling and uncoiling actions, utilizing hand techniques, dynamic footwork, and throws.  Rapid-fire movements draw energy from the center of the abdomen. The circular stepping pattern also builds up centripetal force, allowing the practitioner to maneuver quickly around an opponent.

In media
 Baguazhang inspired the main basis of airbending on the Nickelodeon animated show Avatar: The Last Airbender and its sequel series The Legend of Korra.
 Donut, the noble baker of Pigsty Alley, used Baguazhang on Kung Fu Hustle.
 Shang Chi and the Legend of the Ten Rings features Baguazhang being used by Ying Li, mother for the title character and wife for Wenwu (the MCU's version of the Mandarin).
 Baguazhang is used by Zhang Ziyi as Gong Ruo Mei and Zhang Jin as Ma San on The Grandmaster. 
 Sammo Hung use Baguazhang when playing Hung Chun-nam on Ip Man 2.
 Jet Li uses Baguazhang when playing Gabriel Yulaw on The One.
Baguazhang also inspired the Hyuga clan from  Naruto.

See also
 Bagua—the eight trigrams, used as guiding principles for Baguazhang.
 I Ching—the Chinese Classic relied on by Taoist thinking. 
 Feng Shui—the metaphysical system of interior design based on the Bagua.
 T'ai chi ch'uan-a similar Neijia.

Notes

References
 Robert W. Smith, Chinese Boxing, 
 Bok Nam, Park & Dan Miller, The Fundamentals of Pa Kua Chang: The Methods of Lu Shui-T'ien As Taught by Park Bok Nam, 
 Shou-Yu, Liang, Baguazhang : Emei Baguazhang Theory and Applications, 
 O'Brien, Jess, Nei Jia Quan: Internal Martial Arts Teachers of Tai Ji Quan, Xing Yi Quan, and Ba Gua Zhang, 
 Frantzis, Bruce Kumar, The Power of Internal Martial Arts: Combat Secrets of Ba Gua, Tai Chi, and Hsing-I, 
 Wang Shujin, Bagua Linked Palms - Translated by Kent Howard and Chen Hsiao-Yen,  (1-58394-264-5)
 Wang Shujin, Bagua Swimming Body Palms - Translated by Kent Howard and Chen Hsiao-Yen,  (1-58394-245-9)

External links

 The Pa Kua Chang Journal
 ChinaFromInside.com presents... BAGUAZHANG
 Qiang Shan Ba Gua Zhang Association

 
Chinese swordsmanship
Chinese martial arts
Neijia